Leucoptera calycotomella is a moth in the family Lyonetiidae. It is found in Corsica, Sardinia and mainland Italy.

The larvae feed on Calicotome villosa. They mine the leaves of their host plant. The mine starts as a very narrow corridor, abruptly widening into a flat blotch. Both corridor and blotch are almost completely filled with fine granular frass and only the margins remain free. Pupation takes place outside of the mine.

External links
bladmineerders.nl
Fauna Europaea

Leucoptera (moth)
Moths described in 1939
Moths of Europe
Taxa named by Hans Georg Amsel